The year 584 BC was a year of the pre-Julian Roman calendar. In the Roman Empire, it was known as year 170 Ab urbe condita . The denomination 584 BC for this year has been used since the early medieval period, when the Anno Domini calendar era became the prevalent method in Europe for naming years.

Events

Births
 Mandane of Media, Median princess and mother of Cyrus the Great (approximate date)

Deaths

References